JWH-081 is an analgesic chemical from the naphthoylindole family, which acts as a cannabinoid agonist at both the CB1 and CB2 receptors. With a Ki of 1.2nM it is fairly selective for the CB1 subtype, its affinity at this subtype is measured at approximately 10x the affinity at CB2(12.4nM). It was discovered by and named after John W. Huffman.

JWH-081 may be neurotoxic to animals when administered in high doses.

Legal status

In the United States, JWH-081 is a Schedule I Controlled Substance.

As of October 2015, JWH-081 is a controlled substance in China.

See also 
JWH-018
JWH-098
JWH-164
JWH-198
JWH-210

References 

Designer drugs
JWH cannabinoids
Naphthoylindoles
Phenol ethers
CB1 receptor agonists